Moira Yip (b. 1949) is a British-American linguist. She earned her PhD in Linguistics in 1980 at MIT as a student of Morris Halle. She retired from her position as Professor of Linguistics at University College London (UCL)  in 2009. While at UCL she also was co-director of the Centre for Human Communication and Pro-Provost for China. Before taking up the position at UCL in 1999, she was Professor of Linguistics and Acting Dean at the University of California-Irvine (1992-1999) and Associate Professor at Brandeis University (1982-1992).

Moira Yip worked on a wide range of issues in theoretical phonology, and particularly on the phonology of Chinese. Her publications include papers on reduplication, morpho-phonology, prosodic phonology, and feature theory. Her frequently cited dissertation on the Tonal phonology of Chinese was published in the Outstanding Dissertations in Linguistics series (Routledge). In 2002 she published the first modern textbook on tone in the Cambridge University Press linguistics textbook series. Her 1988 journal article on the Obligatory Contour Principle was important in extending the understanding and application of this principle in pre-Optimality Theory phonology. Since 2017 she has authored a wildlife blog, https://eyesonthewild.blog. 

She is married to business academic George Yip.

Key publications 
 Yip, Moira J. 1980. The tonal phonology of Chinese. PhD dissertation, MIT.
 Yip, Moira. 1988. The Obligatory Contour Principle and Phonological Rules: a Loss of Identity. Linguistic Inquiry, 19 (1), 65-100.
 Yip, Moira. 1989. Contour tones. Phonology, 6(1), 149-174.
 Yip, Moira. 2002. Tone. Cambridge University Press.

References 

Linguists from the United Kingdom
Women linguists
Living people
MIT School of Humanities, Arts, and Social Sciences alumni
1949 births
University of California, Irvine faculty
Brandeis University faculty
University College London
Phonologists